Bar Aftab-e Silab (also Romanized as Bar Āftāb-e Sīlāb) is a village in Zilayi Rural District, Margown District, Boyer-Ahmad County, Kohgiluyeh and Boyer-Ahmad Province, Iran. At the 2006 census, its population was 68, in 12 families.

References 

Populated places in Boyer-Ahmad County